Pougny is a commune in the Nièvre department in central France.

Demographics
On 1 January 2019, the estimated population was 467.

See also
Communes of the Nièvre department

References

Communes of Nièvre